Pop-Eyes is the first solo album by Danielle Dax, an English experimental musician and former member of the Lemon Kittens. It was originally recorded in the fall of 1982 and released on 22 April 1983 on the Awesome Records label. The album was re-released in 1992 on the Biter of Thorpe label (BOT131-01CD) and distributed through World Serpent Distribution.

Dax wrote and produced all the songs on the album as well as playing the guitar, drums, bass, flute, keyboards, banjo, tenor & soprano saxophones, trumpet, tapes, drone guitar, TR-808, toys and voices. The original "Meat Harvest" artwork for Pop Eyes was also created and compiled by Dax during January 1981 and proved to be too shocking for some in the music industry. It was later replaced with artwork created by Holly Warburton. Warburton's artwork can be found in most of Dax's early works.

Track listing

Release history

References

External links
Danielle Dax Official Website
Danielle Dax Artist Profile
The Danielle Dax Profile

1983 debut albums
Danielle Dax albums